Every Scene in Vibrant Green is Josephine Collective's first recorded album recorded by Brandon Paddock and self-released. This album contains early versions of later songs that would be released on their following EP and album.

"Since Feeling Is First"
"In Fair Verona"
"The Morning After"
"Scarlet"
"America's Next Top Model"
"Calling Out the Queen of Hearts"
"Every Scene in Vibrant Green"
"Scarlet (Alternate lyrics/ Acoustic)"

2005 albums
Warner Records albums